The Women's Qatar Classic 2011 is the women's edition of the 2011 Qatar Classic, a squash tournament which is a WSA World Series gold event ($74,000 prize money). The event took place in Doha from 16 October to 21 October. Nicol David won her fourth Qatar Classic trophy, beating Madeline Perry in the final.

Prize money and ranking points
For 2011, the prize purse was $74,000. The prize money and points breakdown is as follows:

Seeds

Draw and results

See also
Qatar Classic
2011 Women's World Open Squash Championship
WSA World Series 2011

References

External links
WSA Qatar Classic 2011 website
Qatar Classic 2011 Squashsite website
Qatar Squash Federation website

Squash tournaments in Qatar
Men's Qatar Classic (squash)
Men's Qatar Classic (squash)
2011 in women's squash